The 2007 Pacific Life Pacific-10 Conference men's basketball tournament was played between March 7 and March 10, 2007, at Staples Center in Los Angeles, California, United States.  The champion of the tournament was Oregon, which received the Pac-10's automatic bid to the NCAA tournament.  The Most Outstanding Player was Tajuan Porter of Oregon.

Seeds
All Pacific-10 schools play in the tournament.  Teams are seeded by conference record, with a tiebreaker system used to seed teams with identical conference records.

Bracket

Asterisks denote overtime period.

Tournament notes
 This was the first time since 2003 that neither of the top two seeds made the final.
Oregon's 24-point win over USC was the 2nd largest margin of victory for the championship game in this tournament's history. (The largest since a 26-point margin by Arizona in 1988).
 Cal's appearance in the semifinals was the best performance for a #8 seed, since Arizona St. had made it to the semifinals in 1990.
Arch-rivals Washington and Washington St. met for the first time ever in the tournament (second round). This was the first meeting in five years for any arch-rival pair.

All tournament team
 Tajuan Porter, Oregon – Tournament MVP
 Bryce Taylor, Oregon
 Aaron Brooks, Oregon
 Gabe Pruitt, USC
 Taj Gibson, USC
 Ryan Anderson, California

References

2006–07 Pacific-10 Conference men's basketball season
Pac-12 Conference men's basketball tournament